Rudolf Deyl may refer to:

Rudolf Deyl, Sr. (1876–1972), Czech actor, father
Rudolf Deyl, Jr. (1912–1967), Czech actor, son